Thabane Rankara (born 12 March 1978) is a Mosotho footballer who currently plays as a striker for Lesotho Prison Service. He has won 11 caps and scored three goals for the Lesotho national football team.

International career

International goals
Scores and results list Lesotho's goal tally first.

References

External links

Association football forwards
Lesotho footballers
Lesotho international footballers
1978 births
Living people
Lesotho Correctional Services players